Humayun Kamrul Islam (known as Humayun Faridi; 29 May 1952 – 13 February 2012) was a Bangladeshi actor and drama organiser. He worked in television dramas, movies and theatre plays. He won Bangladesh National Film Award for Best Actor for his lead role in the film Matritto (2004). He was awarded Ekushey Padak posthumously in 2018 by the Government of Bangladesh.

Early life 
Faridi was born in Narinda, Dhaka on 29 May 1952 to ATM Nurul Islam and Begum Farida Islam. He was the second among five siblings. Pinu was one of his sisters. In 1968, he passed the SSC exam from Islamia Government High School and in 1970 he passed the HSC from Chandpur Government College. In the same year, he entered the University of Dhaka to study organic chemistry. However, due to the Bangladesh Liberation War of 1971, it became impossible to continue his studies and he subsequently took part as a freedom fighter in the war. Later he was admitted to Jahangirnagar University to study economics and became a close associate of dramatist Selim Al-Deen.

Career 

Faridi was discovered by dramatist Nasiruddin Yousuff, who went to serve as a judge to Jahangirnagar University where a play written, directed and acted by Faridi was staged. Faridi was one of the principal organizers of the 1976 Drama Festival of Jahangirnagar University. He joined as a member of the Dhaka Theatre. In 1978, he debuted his theater acting career in the Shakuntala rendition by Selim Al-Deen, playing the character, Tokkhok. After that, he performed in Phoni Monsha in 1980, Kirtankhola as Chaya Ranjan in 1981 and Keramat Mangal as Keramat in 1985. Faridi's last theatre acting was in the mid 1990s in a play called Bhut.

Faridi debuted in the television dramas through his performance in Nil Nakshar Shandaney in 1982. He went on to act in Bhangorer Shobdo Shuni, Songsoptok (1987–88), Pathar Shomoy (1989), Dui Bhai (1990), Shiter Pakhi (1991), Kothao Keu Nei (1992–93), Shomudrey Gangchil (1993), Kachher Manush, and Doll's House (2007–08).

Faridi debuted his film acting career in the film Din-Mojur directed by Shahidul Islam Khokon. He went on to act in Shantrash, Top Rongbaz and Bish Daat.

Personal life 
In 1980, Faridi married Nazmun Ara Begum Minu. They had one daughter – Shararat Islam Devyani. The couple got divorced after four years. He was then married to the actress Suborna Mustafa until 2008.

Faridi died on 13 February 2012 at his residence. He was suffering from chronic lungs disease.

Works

Film 

Onek Diner Asha (1964)
Alo Amar Alo (1971)
Dahan (1985) - Munir
Suchona (1988) - Akkel Ali
Shontrash (1991) - Julmot Ali Khan
Top Rangbaaz (1991)
Utthan Poton (1992)
Beporoa (1992)
Sotorko Shoitan (1993)
Banglar Bodhu (1993) - Abul
Ekattorer Jishu (1993) - Desmond, the caretaker
Anutopto (1993)
Dola (19
Padma Nadir Majhi (1993)
Stree Hotta (1993)
Duhshahosh (1994)
Sneho (1994) - Thanda Mama
Ghatok (1994) - Jamir Box
Ghrina (1994) - BC Lohani
Commander (1994) - Andu Chora / A.R. Khan
Ghorer Shotru (1994)
Konnadaan (1995) - Salamatullah
Bishaw Premik (1995) - Romeo / Boro vai
Anjuman (1995)
Bichar Hobe (1996) - Dobir Morol
Baghini Konna (1996)
Soitan Manush (1996)
Mayer Odhikar (1996)
Nirmom (1996) - Rustam Ali
Palabi Kothai (1997) - Mr. Howladar, Manager
Coolie (1997) - Keramat Ali Bepari
Anondo Asru (1997) - Dewan Sharif
Tumi Shudu Tumi (1997) - Amir Chakladar
Praner Cheye Priyo (1997) - Billat Ali
 Ranga Bou (1998)
Vondo (1998) - The Great Prince
Shanto Keno Mastan (1998)
Ke Amar Baba (1999)
Madam Fuli (1999) - Karam Ali
Pagla Ghonta (1999)
Ranga Bou (1999)
Ashami Bodhu (1999)
Mone Pore Tomake (2000) - Mr. Cotton Ali
Joddha (2000) - Shuk Narayan / Bablu
Kukkhato Khuni (2000) - Ismail Sordar
Bidroho Charidike (2000)
Bichchu Bahini (2000) - Farid Chowdhury
Bhoyongkor Sontrasi (2001)
Eri Nam Bhalobasha (2002)
Kokhono Megh Kokhono Brishti (2003)
Bir Soinik (2003) - Ramjan Molla
Bachelor (2004) - Abrar Bhai
Tyag (2004) - Sidhu Bao
Shyamol Chhaya (2004) - The Freedom Fighter Commander
Joyjatra (2004) - Pocha
Matritwa (2005) - Jabbar
Taka (2005) - Arman Chowdhury
Duratta (2006)
Bangla (2006)
Mayer Morjada (2006)
Rupkothar Golpo (2006) - Drunk man in broken down car
Bindur Chhele (2006) - Jadab
Aha! (2007) - Kishlu
His Dream, His Nightmare (2007) - Ajmol Hossain
Ki Jadu Korila (2008) - Kamal Chairman
Priotomeshu (2009) - Nishad's Brother-in-law
Chehara: Vondo-2 (2010) - Prince
Phirey Esho Behula (2011)
Meherjaan (2011) - Khonkar
Ek Cup Cha (2014) - Afzal Chowdhury
Hulia
Bachelor
Teg
Return Ticket
Kokhono Megh Kokhono Brishti
Takar Ohonkar
Utthan-Poton
Sottru Voyonkor
Ajker Hitler
Atto-Ohongkar
Shukher Sorgoh
Nil Sagorer Tire
Shashon
Sotru Voyonkor
Lat Shaheb
Kuli
Hingsha
A Desh Kar
Mittar Mrityu
Nor Pishach
Bhalobashi Tomake
Shukher Sorgoh
Churmar
Prem Mane Na Badha
Nistur
Bager Thaba
Premer Jala
Palabi Kuthai
Kalo Choshma
Paharadar

Television dramas 
{{columns-list|colwidth=15em|
 Nil Nakshar Shandhany (1982)
 Durbin Die Dekhun (1982)
 Bhangoner Shabdo Shuni (1983)
 Bakulpur Koto Dur (1985)
 Dubhuboner Dui Bashinda
 Ekti Laal Shari
 Mohuar Mon (1986)
 Sat Ashmaner Shiri (1986)
 Ekdin Hothat (1986, TV Movie) - The Teacher
 Chanmiar Negative Positive (1986)
 Manoshi Je Amar (1986)
 Poush Phagun-er Pala Karo Kono Neeti Nai Aloknogor Ojattra (1987)
 Songsoptok (1987–1988)
 Pathar Shomoy (1989)
 Osomoy (1989)
 Dui bhai (1990)
 Shiter Pakhi (1991)
 Kothao Keu Nei (1990)
 Shomudre Gangchil (1993)
 Tini Akjon (2005)
 Pret (2005)
 Chandragrasto (Director) (2006)
 Kacher Manush (2006)
 Mohona (2006)
 Vober Hat (2007)
 Tobuo Protikkha (Director)
 J Jibon Hoyni Japon (2007)
 Srinkhal (2010)
 Prioy Jon Nibash (2011)
 Arman Bhai The Gentle Man (2011)
 Rater Otithi67
}}

 Theatrical plays Montasir FantasyKirtonkholaKeramot MongolDurto wee''

References

External links 
 

1952 births
2012 deaths
Jahangirnagar University alumni
Bangladeshi male film actors
Bangladeshi male stage actors
Bangladeshi male television actors
Best Actor National Film Award (Bangladesh) winners
Recipients of the Ekushey Padak